Kevin Mital (born April, 1999) is a Canadian football wide receiver for the Laval Rouge et Or of the RSEQ conference of U Sports. He is a Vanier Cup champion after winning with the Rouge et Or in 2022 and was named the game's MVP. He also won the Hec Crighton Trophy in 2022 as U Sports football's most outstanding player.

University career

Syracuse Orange
Mital first committed to play college football for the Syracuse Orange in 2019 where he used a redshirt season. However, on July 1, 2020, it was reported that he had decided to leave Syracuse and transfer schools.

Laval Rouge et Or
Mital transferred to Université Laval in 2020, where he intended to play for the Laval Rouge et Or, but the 2020 U Sports football season was cancelled. In 2021, he played in eight regular season games where he had 45 receptions for 554 yards and seven touchdowns and was named a Second Team All-Canadian.

In 2022, Mital had a dominant season as he finished first in the country in receptions, receiving yards, and receiving touchdowns, with 58 catches for 751 yards and 12 touchdowns in eight regular season games. For his strong season, Mital was named a First Team All-Canadian and won the Hec Crighton Trophy, becoming the first receiver to win the award since 2005. In the post-season, he led the Rouge et Or to a Dunsmore Cup championship as he recorded nine receptions for 116 yards and three touchdowns in the victory over the Montreal Carabins. Mital then played in his first Vanier Cup game where he led all receivers with eight receptions for 142 yards and had one passing touchdown for one yard. He was named the 57th Vanier Cup game's Most Valuable Player as the Rouge et Or defeated the Saskatchewan Huskies by a score of 30–24.

Mital intends to play in at least one more season with the Rouge et Or and is eligible for the 2024 CFL Draft.

Personal life
Mital was born to parents Chantal and Mario Mital and has one sister.

References

External links
Laval Rouge et Or bio 

1999 births
Living people
Laval Rouge et Or football players
Canadian football wide receivers
Players of Canadian football from Quebec
People from Longueuil